Patricia A. McCoy (born January 26, 1955) is an American politician who serves as the Minority Leader in the Vermont House of Representatives and from the Rutland district as a member of the Republican Party. She has served as the town clerk and treasurer in Poultney, Vermont since 1991.

Early life and education

Patricia A. McCoy was born in Bridgeport, Connecticut, on January 26, 1955. She graduated from Stratford High School, and the University of Connecticut with a Bachelor of Science degree in environmental resource management. She married Matthew McCoy, with whom she had three children, and has lived in Poultney, Vermont since 1979.

Career

Local politics

McCoy initially supported the Democratic Party after moving to Vermont. She was first elected to serve as Poultney's town clerk and treasurer in 1991, to succeed Josephine Williams, who had retired after having served since 1982. McCoy became the treasurer for the Poultney school district following the resignation of the business manager of the Rutland Southwest Supervisory Union and served in that role until she appointed Steve Parker as assistant school treasurer. She was selected to serve as the treasurer of the Vermont Municipal Clerks and Treasurers Association in 2000, and the organization gave her the Clerk of the Year Award alongside Gary Snider.

Vermont House of Representatives

Andy Donaghy, a Republican member of the Vermont House of Representatives, retired during the 2014 election. She won the Republican nomination without opposition and faced no opposition in the 2014, 2016, and 2018 elections. She defeated independent candidate Tyler-Joseph Ballard in the 2020 election.

During her tenure in the state house she has served on the Human Services, Commerce and Economic Development, Transportation, Rules, Legislative Council committees. She was selected to serve as assistant minority leader alongside Representative Brian K. Savage in 2016, and was selected to replace Donald H. Turner as Minority Leader when he ran for lieutenant governor in 2018.

Electoral history

References

21st-century American politicians
21st-century American women politicians
1955 births
Living people
Republican Party members of the Vermont House of Representatives
People from Bridgeport, Connecticut
University of Connecticut alumni
Women state legislators in Vermont